Kismetwala is a 1986 Bollywood Indian action film directed by S. D. Narang. It stars Mithun Chakraborty, Ranjeeta, Asha Parekh in lead roles, along with Prem Chopra, Shakti Kapoor in supporting roles.

Cast
Mithun Chakraborty as Raja
Ranjeeta Kaur as Anita
Asha Parekh as Asha / Shobha
Prem Chopra as Thakur Baldev Singh
Shakti Kapoor as Ranjeet
Sujit Kumar
Kim

Songs
Lyrics: Anjaan

External links
 

1986 films
1980s Hindi-language films
Films scored by Bappi Lahiri
Indian action films
1986 action films